Alfred Read (3 March 1909 – 9 September 1987) was a British radio comedian active throughout the 1950s and 1960s.  Originally a businessman, he has been described as highly influential on British comedy.

Early life
Read was born in Broughton, Salford, Lancashire.   On leaving school he worked at the family meat-processing firm, E. and H. Read Ltd, initially as a salesman before becoming a director in his early 20s.  He always wanted to perform - on one occasion, when he was 18, he performed impressions of Maurice Chevalier in clubs in Bolton before being found by his father and having to return to work as a meat-products salesman.   After his father died he started running the family business while continuing to take opportunities to entertain at local dinners and in clubs.

Early business career
He became a prosperous and well-respected local businessman.  In the Second World War his company won a lucrative contract with the NAAFI to supply sausages, enabling him to spend more time in the evenings as an after-dinner speaker.   He honed his skills with carefully observed characterisations ranging from drunks to know-alls and cheeky children.  After moving to Lytham St Annes he spent time playing golf, where he met many of the show business figures who performed in nearby Blackpool, and started active attempts to develop a second career as a comedian.  In 1948 he paid a local theatre producer to let him perform in a show on the South Pier, but the performance was unsuccessful owing  to Read's stage fright and he returned to his business interests.

Comedy career
In early 1950 he hosted a dinner for business contacts in Manchester and entertained them with some of his monologues and dialogues in which he played both voices.  His humour was observational and was about Northern English working class people, often in a domestic situation. According to writer Graham McCann:  "Most professional comedians, before Al Read, concentrated on telling gags and/or short but obviously contrived tall tales. Here, in stark contrast, was someone talking about the kind of experience that most people in the audience had endured, except he was exaggerating it just enough to make the listeners laugh not only at the protagonists but also at themselves."   The response to Read was so good that it was overheard by another guest coincidentally staying at the same hotel, regional BBC Radio producer Bowker Andrews, who invited him to perform the routine on his radio show Variety Fanfare.   Broadcast on 17 February 1950, it launched Read's comedy career.

Read quickly became popular on regional and then national radio broadcasts, such as Variety Bandbox and Workers' Playtime.   Unusually for the time, his humour reflected everyday life, situations and characters, widely recognisable and only slightly exaggerated for comic effect.  According to McCann: "His ability to flit back and forth between speakers and personalities was impressive in itself, but the seemingly effortless yet unfailingly precise rhythms of his speech, and the deftness of his key turns of phrase, were even more remarkable."   McCann described him as "pioneering", with an "immense" influence on British comedy.

In 1951 he was invited by bandleader Henry Hall to star in the summer season at Blackpool's Central Pier, and the King invited him to perform at Windsor Castle.  He recorded monthly editions of his programme, The Al Read Show, in advance, allowing him to diverge from the usual radio variety show format.  It featured guest performers including Jimmy Edwards and Pat Kirkwood.  The programme was one of the most popular radio comedy shows in the UK in the 1950s and 1960s.   Up to 35 million people listened to it each week.  The introduction to his radio show was usually "Al Read: introducing us to ourselves"; and he himself described his work as "pictures of life".   His catchphrases "Right, Monkey!" and "You'll be lucky - I say, you'll be lucky!", and "And he was strong", were well known. The Al Read Show series was recorded as outside broadcasts from the Hulme Hippodrome, rented on Sundays by the BBC, with archived papers dating recordings between 1952 and 1955.

In 1954 he appeared high on the bill at the Royal Variety Performance at the London Palladium, and in 1959 he appeared with comedian Jimmy Clitheroe in the Royal Northern Variety Performance, in the presence of the Queen Mother, at the Palace Theatre, Manchester.  The American comedian Bob Newhart came to an arrangement with Read to adapt and perform some of his routines, with the result that some of the material originally written and developed by Read, such as ‘The Driving Instructor’, became associated more with Newhart.

In 1963 Read headed a variety format for ITV called Life and Al Read 
, which was apparently unscripted and was broadcast live.   In 1966 a BBC TV series called Al Read Says What a Life! was broadcast.   However Read's humour did not transfer very well to television, with a critic in The Stage commenting: "I'm only interested in what he has to say - I don't care what he looks like...".  His final TV series, It's All In Life, in 1973, was also unsuccessful, and Read returned to radio for a final series in 1976.

Later life
He retired from performance in the 1970s while continuing to run his business interests from homes in Yorkshire and Spain.  In 1984 a further series of radio shows, Such Is Life, was broadcast, drawing on privately recorded routines from earlier years since the BBC recordings had been destroyed.  Read published an autobiography, It's All in the Book, the same year.

Death
Read died in hospital in Northallerton, Yorkshire, in 1987, aged 78, following a series of strokes.

The Al Read Show
Surviving editions held by the BBC Sound Archive:

References

 Papillon Graphics Encyclopaedia of Greater Manchester, 2002
 BBC.co.uk Guide to Comedy
  Episode guide

External links
   Profile of Read by Padraig Colman

Comedians from Lancashire
English male comedians
1909 births
1987 deaths
People from Broughton, Greater Manchester
20th-century English comedians